Chickpea noghl (leblebi şekeri), or sugar-coated chickpea, is a traditional Iranian,  Afghan, and Turkish confection. It is made by boiling sugar with water and rose water and then coating roasted chickpeas in the mixture.

References 

Sugar confectionery
Iranian desserts
Afghan cuisine
Turkish desserts
Chickpea dishes